Khutulun ( – ), also known as Aigiarne, Aiyurug, Khotol Tsagaan or Ay Yaruq was a Mongol noblewoman and wrestler, the most famous daughter of Kaidu, a cousin of Kublai Khan. Her father was "most pleased by her abilities", and she accompanied him on military campaigns. Both Marco Polo and Rashid al-Din Hamadani wrote accounts of their encounters with her.

Life
Khutulun was born about 1260. By 1280, her father Kaidu became the most powerful ruler of Central Asia, reigning in the realms from western Mongolia to Oxus, and from the Central Siberian Plateau to India.

Marco Polo described Khutulun as a superb warrior, one who could ride into enemy ranks and snatch a captive as easily as a hawk snatches a chicken. She assisted her father in many battles, particularly against the Yuan Dynasty of her cousin the Great Khan – Kublai (r. 1260–1294).

Khutulun insisted that any man who wished to marry her must defeat her in wrestling. Winning horses from competitions and the wagers of would-be suitors, it is said that she gathered a herd numbering ten thousand.

Sources vary about her husband's identity. Some chronicles say her husband was a handsome man who failed to assassinate her father and was taken prisoner; others refer to him as Kaidu's companion from the Choros clan. Rashid al-Din wrote that Khutulun fell in love with Ghazan, Mongol ruler in Persia.

Of all Kaidu's children, Khutulun was the favorite, and the one from whom he most sought advice and political support. According to some accounts, he tried to name her as his successor to the khanate before he died in 1301. However, his choice was declined due to her male relatives. When Kaidu died, Khutulun guarded his tomb with the assistance of her brother Orus. She was challenged by her other brothers including Chapar and relative Duwa because she resisted their succession. She died in 1306.

In popular culture

Khutulun is thought to be the basis for the character of Turandot, who has been the subject of a number of Western works. While in Mongol culture she is remembered as a famous athlete and warrior, in Western artistic adaptations she is depicted as a proud woman who finally succumbs to love.

François Pétis de la Croix's 1710 book of Asian tales and fables contains a story in which Khutulun is called Turandot, a Persian word (Turandokht توراندخت) meaning "Central Asian Daughter", and is the nineteen-year-old daughter of Altoun Khan, the Mongol emperor of China. In Pétis de La Croix's story, however, she does not wrestle her suitors, and they do not wager horses; rather, she has them answer three riddles, and they are executed if they cannot solve them.

Carlo Gozzi wrote his own version 50 years later, a stage play in which she was a "tigerish woman" of "unrelenting pride". Friedrich Schiller translated and adapted the play into German as Turandot, Prinzessin von China in 1801.

The most famous version of Turandot is Giacomo Puccini's operatic version, which he was working on when he died in 1924.

There are many stories and novels about Khutulun presented by Mongolian writers, such as Khotolon by Purev Sanj, Kaidu's wonderful daughter Khutulun by Ch.Janchivdorj, Khotol Tsagaan by Oyungerel Tsedevdamba, The Story of Kaidu Khan by Batjargal Sanjaa, and Princess Khutulun by B. Shuudertsetseg.

Khutulun is portrayed by Claudia Kim in the Netflix series Marco Polo.

Khutulun was the name chosen for a popular racehorse in Australia 2011–2019, which was bought by Grand Syndicates for just A$16,000 and eventually won nearly A$500,000 in prize money.

On 3 December 2021, Shuuder Productions and Voo Broadcasting released the film Princess Khutulun. The movie is based on the novel Khotol Tsagaan Gunj by Mongolian author Baatarsuren Shuudertsetseg and takes place during the Yuan Dynasty. Actress Tsedoo Munkhbat played the starring role.

References

Further reading
Jack Weatherford – The Secret History of the Mongol Queens
"Warriors: Asian Women in Asian Society" from Colorq.org
"Heroines: Mongolian Women" from Womeninworldhistory.com
Rossabi, Morris; Khubilai Khan; pp. 104–105, 252; 
Polo, Marco. The Book of Sir Marco Polo, The Venetian: Concerning the Kingdoms and Marvels of the East. 2nd ed. Trans. Colonel Henry Yule. Vol. 2. London: John Murray, 1875. 461–464. Print.

Women in 13th-century warfare
Women of the Mongol Empire
Women in war in East Asia
Borjigin
1260s births
1300s deaths
Year of birth uncertain
Mongolian wrestlers
Chagatai Khanate
House of Ögedei
Female generals
13th-century Mongolian women
14th-century Mongolian women